Jack Brown Genius is a 1996 New Zealand romantic comedy fantasy film directed by Tony Hiles, produced by Peter Jackson and written by both with Jackson's partner Fran Walsh. Actor Tim Balme, who had earlier starred in Jackson's movie Braindead, plays the title role.

Synopsis
The brain of inventor Jack Brown is possessed by the soul of a medieval monk who thinks he knows the secret of how to fly.

Awards
The film won three awards at the 1996 New Zealand Film and Television Awards:
 Best Actor (Tim Balme)
 Best Director (Tony Hiles)
 Best Film Score (Michelle Scullion)
It was also nominated for the best Film award at Fantasporto

References

External links
 
 Jack Brown, Genius, thorough information and trailer on "NZ On Screen, New Zealand's screen culture showcase"

Romantic fantasy films
New Zealand romantic comedy films
New Zealand fantasy films
1996 films
WingNut Films films
Films shot in New Zealand
Films with screenplays by Peter Jackson
Films with screenplays by Fran Walsh
1990s English-language films